Inlet is an unincorporated community in Fulton County, in the U.S. state of Ohio.

History
A post office called Inlet was established in 1897, and remained in operation until 1903. In 1920, Inlet was one of three communities listed in Chesterfield Township.

References

Unincorporated communities in Fulton County, Ohio
Unincorporated communities in Ohio